Joel Figueroa (born June 29, 1989) is a Canadian football offensive tackle for the Hamilton Tiger-Cats of the Canadian Football League (CFL).

College career
Figueroa played college football for the Miami Hurricanes.

Professional career

Hamilton Tiger-Cats
Figueroa originally signed with the Hamilton Tiger-Cats as a free agent on April 10, 2013, and spent three years with the team.

Edmonton Eskimos
Figueroa signed with the Edmonton Eskimos as a free agent in 2016 and also spent the 2017 season with the club.

BC Lions
Upon entering free agency in 2018, Figueroa signed with the BC Lions. In 2019, he was the BC Lions Most Outstanding Offensive Lineman. He signed a contract extension with the Lions on January 20, 2021. He played in four seasons and 66 games with the Lions and became a free agent upon the expiry of his contract on February 14, 2023.

Hamilton Tiger-Cats (II)
On February 15, 2023, it was announced that Figueroa had signed a two-year contract with the Hamilton Tiger-Cats.

References

External links
Hamilton Tiger-Cats bio

1985 births
Living people
Canadian football offensive linemen
Edmonton Elks players
Hamilton Tiger-Cats players
Miami Hurricanes football players
Players of American football from Miami
North Miami Senior High School alumni
American football offensive linemen
American players of Canadian football
BC Lions players
Players of Canadian football from Miami
Puerto Rican players of American football
People from Río Piedras, Puerto Rico